Picacho, is a populated place in Doña Ana County, New Mexico.

History

Picacho de los Nevarez
The village of Picacho was originally settled in 1855, by a party of settlers from Socorro, New Mexico, led by Candelaro Chavez. The original name of the village was Picacho de los Nevarez, named after the local name of Picacho Mountain, a peak named after the Nevarez family.

Picacho Station
Picacho village was the site of Picacho Station a stagecoach station of the 4th Division of the Butterfield Overland Mail from 1858 to 1861. Located in the village of Picacho, it was 6 miles west and north of Mesilla, New Mexico and 15 miles east of the Rough and Ready Station where the road passed through Picacho Pass then south to the station in the village. This station had the last natural water available on the route westward until Cooke's Spring 52 miles away, although the later intervening stations of Goodsight and Rough and Ready, hauled in water and constructed earthen tanks to catch what little rain water fell at their locations.

References

History of Doña Ana County, New Mexico
Geography of Doña Ana County, New Mexico
Butterfield Overland Mail in New Mexico Territory
American frontier
San Antonio–San Diego Mail Line
1858 establishments in New Mexico Territory
Stagecoach stops in the United States